Rosalind Young may refer to:

 Rosalind Amelia Young (1853–1924), historian from the Pitcairn Islands
 Rosalind Tanner (née Young, 1900–1992), mathematician and historian of mathematics